is Toei's eleventh entry of the Super Sentai metaseries. It aired on TV Asahi from February 28, 1987 to February 20, 1988, replacing Choushinsei Flashman and was replaced by Choujyu Sentai Liveman with a total of 51 episodes. Its international English title as listed by Toei is simply Maskman.

It was the first Super Sentai series that showcased each members having their own individual vehicles that forms their robot, it also introduced non-Japanese martial arts discipline.

Plot

Commander Sugata is a scientist and sage who excels in mental reinforcements and is a master of every martial arts discipline. He discovered the existence of the Underground Empire Tube, a once peaceful kingdom that has turned into a malignant force under the mysterious Zeba, who desires to conquer the surface. In order to stand against them and thwart their plans, Sugata recruits five young people to become the Maskmen. Each becomes specialized in a style of martial arts, and Sugata teaches them the ways of the mystical . A year after Sugata recruits and trains the Maskmen, the Underground Empire Tube is ready to strike. Princess Ial of the deposed Igam Royal Family, sent to spy above ground as Mio, falls in love with Takeru, and wishes for those underground and above ground to coexist. She is kidnapped and imprisoned in ice for her betrayal. As Takeru and the Maskmen battle Tube, they learn about Ial and Igam's relationship, and a terrible dark secret about Zeba, the Tube leader.

Characters

Maskmen

The Maskmen are the top secret fighting force formed by Sanjuro Sugata. Before Tube surfaced, the group posed as the pit crew of the Sugata Racing Team.
He is a specialist in Karate and a Formula One driver. He was spotted by Sugata a year prior to the beginning of the series while he saved the mother's infant from being crashed in the railway. Sugata later offered him a spot on the Maskman team. His love for Mio and desire to find her are his motivations. While in Otaki, Takeru meets Norio through whom he masters the "God Hand" technique. Igam tries to eliminate him by travelling into the past. Near the end of the series, he single-handedly defeats Baraba out of rage in battle. He reunites with Mio in the end but he is forced to split up with her.
He specializes in Kobudo. He is shy around women but can be a playboy at times. He is lighthearted, strong, and dependable. When a Dogler Beast stole the Aura Power of the other Maskmen, Kenta was the only one left who could fight. He worked as a mechanic for the Sugata Racing Team and once worked for the Sun Racing Team.
He is an expert in Chinese Kung-Fu and a straight sword expert. His father died while he was young and he was an only child. He moved to Tokyo in order to perfect his martial arts ability and to join the Maskmen. Akira unknowingly enters a Tube-rigged tournament. He wants to win to prove to his mother that he is successful in his chosen pursuit. Always cheerful, he loves apples and the idol Youko Minamino. Late in the series, he turns evil after being possessed by the spirit of a swordsman of the Royal Underground Empire named . Unas was resurrected by some of the Royal Underground slaves of Tube in hopes that he would help set them free from Zeba's tyrannical rule. The underground slaves mistake Akira as a reincarnation of Unas. During the events of Kaizoku Sentai Gokaiger, Akira would appear to grant the Greater Power of the Maskmen to the Gokaigers. The Aura Power would later allow the Gokaigers to use the Aura in their attack Gokai Aura Galaxy.
She was raised in a family of Ninja, brought up to carry the tradition at the cost of a happy childhood. Forced by her father to abandon all feminine things to focus on her ninja training, she appears tomboyish and is a fierce fighter. She is highly intelligent and loves dancing as she tutors a young girl who is unable to afford dance lessons.
A young woman with a pure heart, she often teaches t'ai chi to young people. She once, by chance, met Ial and Igam's mother, who gave her the saintly flower known as Carollove. Momoko treasures it because it saved her when she fell underground as a child. The first four letters of her name is the kanji for her color designation.

Arsenal
 : The transformation device of the Maskman. They transform by saying .
 : The sidearms of the team that can be used as guns or transformed into swords.
 : The team's first finishing cannon, with Red Mask donning a backpack. It was destroyed by Kiros and Beam Doggler in Episode 27.
 : The second finishing cannon of the team, built to replace the Shot Bomber. It can double as a flight rider for Red Mask.

Vehicles
 : A buggy based on  designs of the Sugata Super F1 racecar. It is driven by Red Mask and fires the Spin Magnum. Its maximum speed is 470 kilometers per hour.
 : Black through Pink's Suzuki RG250 motorcycles. Their maximum speed is 330 km/h.
 : A carrier mecha in the shape of a gigantic sportscar that carries either the component mecha of Great Five or the Land Galaxy. It is not to be confused with 1989 Super Sentai series Kousoku Sentai Turboranger due to its Japanese pronunciation.

Mecha
 : A giant robot formed from five components when the command "Combine! Five Cross!" is given. When the Great Five was taken from the Maskmen, it was briefly controlled by Kimen Doggler until the Galaxy Robo forced the parasite off.
 : It is piloted by Red Mask. It is stored in the cabin of the Turbo Ranger. It forms the head and chest of the Great Five. It appears again in Gaoranger vs Super Sentai.
 : It is driven by Black Mask, stored in the trunk of the Turbo Ranger, and is able to fire the Drill Beam. It forms the main torso and upper legs of the Great Five and the Great Gun.
 : It is driven by Blue Mask, stored in the hood of the Turbo Ranger behind the Masky Jet and the Masky Gyro. It is able to fire the Tank Cannon. It forms the lower legs of the Great Five.
 : It is piloted by Yellow Mask. It is stored in the hood of the Turbo Ranger, to the left of the Masky Gyro. It forms the left arm of the Great Five and the Five Shield.
 : It is piloted by Pink Mask. It is stored in the hood of the Turbo Ranger, to the right of the Masky Jet and with rotors folded for ease of storage. It forms the right arm of the Great Five and the Gyro Cutter.
 : A large tractor trailer for the Maskmen, piloted by the entire group. The Land Galaxy was built as part of a competition to determine the mecha to be used by the Maskmen but was considered too unstable to control when it seemingly killed its creator. It was only when the Great Five was captured by Tube that the Maskmen found the Land Galaxy and added it to their arsenal.
: The second robot formed from the Land Galaxy when the command "Galaxy Change!" is given. It can be transported by the Turbo Ranger in lieu of the Great Five components.

Allies

 : Sugata is a scientist and martial artist who formed the Maskman team. He is a wise man who excels in mental reinforcements and every martial art. Sugata was the one learned of Tube's existence and their plot to conquer the surface world. A mysterious man, Sugata fights against Takeru the year before he was chosen to become Red Mask. He is the owner of Sugata Racing, a motoring team for which Takeru is a driver and Kenta once worked as an engineer.
 : Sugata's assistant; she works in the computer room and monitors the performance of the Maskman team.
 : A Caucasian woman who assists Commander Sugata alongside Doctor Azuma.
 : The daughter of Ijin of the Fu Clan, Yu is a rogue ninja who works to find any Tube relics that would reveal the true identity of Zeba.
 :  A mermaid from the Sea of Tears, an underground lake formed from human tears over the millennia. Having a lovely singing voice, Igam deceives Lelai as part of a scheme involving Horn Doggler. Once Lelai learns the truth, she is forced to sing after Igam caused the Sea of Tears to dry up. Takeru manages to save her and takes her to the ocean to keep her alive.
 : The deceased creator of the Galaxy Robo and a close friend of Chief Sugata. During the early development of the M-Project, Yamagata built the Galaxy Robo by himself in order to provide the future Maskman team with another robot in addition to the Great Five of Sugata. However, he died during a freak accident while testing out the Galaxy Robo. Doctor Yamagata is survived by his only daughter, who believes that the Galaxy Robo, which was programmed with a free will, was responsible for the death of her father. However, Yamagata's recording during his final test run with the Galaxy Robo proves that his death was entirely accidental and was not the fault of the Galaxy Robo.
 : The chief designer of the Jet Cannon. He loses consciousness as the final tests begin, due to the long term effects of Deathga Doggler's attack when he was a child.
 : A member of the Jet Cannon development staff who assists Akaike. He is played by Kazuhiko Nishimura, who would go on to play Jō Ōhara in Chōjū Sentai Liveman.
 : A former disciple of Chief Sugata who was chosen to be part of the M-Project, which gave him the ability to transform into , a predecessor to the main Maskman team. However, Ryo abandoned Sugata's unit after his girlfriend  was killed during an ambush by Tube, causing Ryo to doubt his ability to protect the world since he was unable to protect the woman he loved. Ryo arrives to help the Maskman team when they are overpowered by Magma Doggler. With Takeru's help, Ryo regain his self-confidence and assists the team in defeating Magma Doggler, but at the cost of his powers. At the end, he leaves the Maskman team to teach martial arts to children with a renewed sense of hope. He is also the first Sixth Hero, although it would not occur again until five years later in 1992, where Kyoryu Sentai Zyuranger introduced an official Sixth Hero.
 Mai Kozuki (40): A talented pianist who is actually from the Underground's , his music soothes the most savage of Underground monsters. Zeba orders the death of the family, and Mai is the sole survivor. Sugata saves her and brings her to the Maria Orphanage after rewriting her memories so she can live without her painful memories. Targeted by Bard Doggler, her hand is turned to stone and the Maskmen restore it.
 Ise (11, 44 & 45): A rogue underground dweller who, along with her brother Teto, is part of a cult that worships the Underground Knight Unas. Though disillusioned when Unas is controlled by Igam, she and her brother help the Maskmen return their friend to normal.

Underground Empire Tube

The  is a peaceful underground empire that came into being five millennia ago under the rule of the Igam family. Once it comes under the rule of the usurper Zeba, Tube begins preparing for war on the surface. They are based at the  until Zeba has it destroyed.

 : Zeba is the leader of the underground Empire Tube. He hates all human beings and is a master of the Dark Aura, desiring to turn the surface into a cold and dark place. His true form is the monster  whose father, the original Lethal Doggler, is killed by the Igam Family for terrorizing the underground. Before dying, it spawns an egg that results in Zeba's birth; the child devours his parent to become stronger. The new Lethal Doggler grows with nothing on his mind but revenge, disguising himself as Zeba and rule the Igam Royal Family. Upon assuming the throne, Zeba corrupts the underground into a violent kingdom and enslaves the underground humans. When he learns that his defeat was foretold to be at the hands of the surviving twin daughters of the Igam family, he keeps them apart while taking measures to ensure no one learns about his true identity, momentarily assumes his true form whenever someone gets too close to the truth. With Ial revived and his identity revealed, Zeba quickly enacts his final plan to raise the Underground Castle and spread his Dark Aura around the world to usher in an age of darkness at the cost of his followers. Once on the surface, Zeba battles the Maskmen personally in his Dark Aura domain. However, Ial and Igam augment their powers with the Maskmen's to negate his Dark Aura. Forced back into his true form, the Lethal Doggler is blasted by the Jet Cannon at full power, using the energies from the weapon to enlarge himself before being finally destroyed by the Galaxy Robo.
 : The older twin sister of Princess Ial, she is raised as a man to one day take the throne until Zeba overthrew her parents. As a result, Ial is spared to serve under Zeba as one of his prized warriors. She is trained in the way of combat by the Fu Clan and uses the dragon gauntlets on her forearms to execute attacks. When Ial falls in love with Takeru, Igam feels her sister is a disgrace to their family, and vows to kill Takeru. She also has a desire to kill Ial for her transgression, but she cannot carry it out under orders from Zeba himself. One of her attempts in killing Takeru involves conjuring the Death Ring, a family tradition where the user uses up their energy to project an electrified force field. When Baraba gains the Royal Underground Sword, Igam is forced to turn to the Igam Dragon for aid. When Akira is restored from being Unas, Igam's identity as a woman is revealed to the Maskmen. Takeru then hesitates to fight her and attempts to reason with her. After she is given permission to kill her sister, Igam learns the truth behind Zeba and is conflicted until she learns that he used her to achieve his goal. Disillusioned and seeing herself beyond redemption, Igam finds a new reason to live when she sees the Buddha as she helps the Maskmen defeat Zeba. Soon after, Igam becomes a Buddhist nun to repent for her sins, and leaves her sister to become the new heir to the Igam kingdom.
 : He is an overweight beast who is three centuries old and knows all, a master of dark arts who uses a croquet mallet as his weapon. As the advisor of Zeba, he is able to freely access the Underground Library, which contains the history of the Tube civilization. Normally remaining at the sidelines, Anagmas first reveals himself to the Maskmen prior to setting up a scheme to remove Great Five. Later, he learns the truth about Zeba and is sent to kill Ial. Anagmas is killed by the Maskmen with the Jet Cannon and the Galaxy Robo.
 : A cold-blooded, sadistic and merciless skilled swordsman and strongman of the Baluga tribe and is a rival of Igam. He carries a heavy blade that only he is strong enough to use in battle. When sentenced to death by Zeba for his failure, he goes to the Underground Dungeon to kill the Devil Doggler and obtain the Royal Underground Sword. He lost the fight until he is driven mad by his mother's death at the hands of the monster, killing the monster with the Royal Underground Sword. Later, after failing to revive the War God, Baraba gets one last chance to redeem himself. He makes a deal with Kiros and kidnaps Princess Ial to lure Takeru into a trap. Once the plan falls apart, and Oyobu turns his back on him, Baraba is killed by Red Mask in a final duel.
 : A ninja of the Buyon tribe with red skin and large pointy ears who serves under Baraba. He can throw life-manifested fire from his hands and run at near-lightspeed. While pleading with his master not to take Ial, he ends up being frozen but manages to thaw himself out. Though he comes to the aid of his master, Oyobu refuses to aid Baraba in his final fight. Though he learns the truth about Zeba and discovers that he is nothing more than an expandable pawn, Oyobu continues his part in the fiend's plan in sacrificing the Underground Castle as he is consumed in the resulting explosion.
 : A Kunoichi of the Fu clan, a group of ninja who have served under the Igam family for generations. She is able to shoot shurikens and fire from her mouth, Fumin's abilities rival those of Haruka. She assumes guises like that of the idol Marina Shimada during Igam's plan of turning humans into Unglers. Though she learns her mistress' identity, Fumin remains by Igam's side until she is killed in the Underground Castle while protecting Igam when the castle is being destroyed.
 : A Mole cricket-like creature that emerges when the monsters of the Tube Empire are defeated by the Maskmen. With its ray, the Doggler monsters are enlarged as Okelampa utters  before taking his leave. The fate of Okelampa is never revealed.
 : The black-skinned foot soldiers with vines covering their faces. Their name derives from "underground".

Kiros

 : A wandering undergrounder under no one's authority who is relentless in getting what he wants. Kiros sees Ial's beauty and attempts to make her his own. He saves her from Hell's Wind chasm but falls down into the pit. After managing to escape Hell's Wind by mastering the Crescent Screw, Kiros attacks the Maskmen, requesting Ial in exchange for aiding Tube. He learns about Takeru's relationship to Ial and Kiros became Igam's rival in trying to kill Red Mask. Kiros tricks Baraba and spirits Ial's frozen prison into Hell's Wind to break her free. Mortally wounded in an attempt to protect her, Kiros dies as he realizes that Ial is the only thing he could never have.

Others

Once on the surface, Ial meets and falls in love with Takeru. When Tube's forces are ready to attack, she warns Takeru, but is captured by Igua. Brought before Zeba, Ial is sentenced to the Eternal Freeze, living in an endless nightmare while encased in ice. Thanks to Kiros' actions, Ial is freed from her prison and helps the Maskmen destroy Zeba. She is forced to leave Takeru to fulfill her duties as the new empress, though she still has feelings for him. She has him promise to look towards the future.
: The mother of Baraba, who raised him on the ideologies of the Baluga tribe. She tricks Akira into taking her to his son. Laraba attacks the Devil Doggler and wounds the beast enough for her son to finish the job, though she dies by its hand. She was played by Machiko Soga who previously portrayed Queen Haedrian in the 1980 Series Denshi Sentai Denjiman and its 1981 Sequel Taiyou Sentai Sun Vulcan, and later Played Witch Bandora in the 1992's Kyōryū Sentai Zyuranger and Heavenly Arch Saint Magiel in 2005's Mahou Sentai Magiranger.
 : The Igan Family guardian who follows the will of an Igam clansman. It is revived by Igam to help her fight the Maskmen. Once Ial is revived, the Igam Dragon secretly aids her by giving her the water mirror ball containing the truth about Zeba.

Episodes

Film

A film version of Hikari Sentai Maskman premiered on July 18, 1987 at the "Toei Manga Matsuri" film festival, where it was shown as part of a quadruple feature alongside Dragon Ball: Sleeping Princess in Devil's Castle, Saint Seiya: The Movie and the film version of Choujinki Metalder.

Cast

 Takeru: Ryousuke Kaizu
 Kenta: Kouichi Kusakari
 Akira/Unas: Issei Hirota
 Haruka: Yuki Nagata
 Momoko: Kanako Maeda 
 Commander Sanjuro Sugata: Hayato Tani
 Ryo Asuka: Shinji Higashi (episode 39)
 Emperor Zeba: Hideaki Kusaka
 Prince (Princess) Igam, Princess Ial: Mina Asami
 Commander Baraba: Keijiro Shiga
 Oyubu: Yoshinori Okamoto
 Kiros: Shunta Fuchino
 Fumin: Kaori Kubota
 Hikari: Yoshiro Iwata
 Doctor Catherine: Mimi Bruce (episode 3)
 Laraba: Machiko Soga (episode 30)
 Shinya: Tohru Sakai (episode 32)
 Lelai: Tomoko Ikeda (movie)
 Narrator: Hiroshi Takeda

Voice Actors

 Emperor Zeba: Seizō Katō (voice)
 Anagumas: Takuzo Kamiyama (voice)
 Okelamp: Nobu Shinoda (voice)

Songs

Opening theme
 
 Lyrics: 
 Composition: 
 Arrangement: 
 Artist: Hironobu Kageyama

Movie Opening theme
 
 Lyricist: Kazunori Sonobe
 Composition: Takeshi Ike
 Arrangement: Daito Fujita
 Artist: Hironobu Kageyama

Ending theme
 
 Lyrics: Masao Urino
 Composition: Daisuke Inoue
 Arrangement: Ohzuchi Fujita
 Artist: Hironobu Kageyama
In both opening and ending themes in the Philippine dub of the series, it was composed by singer and composer Norman Caraan.

International Broadcasts
Maskman was the first Super Sentai series dubbed in Malay and Filipino languages. It was aired in the Philippines on ABS-CBN and in Malaysia on TV3 from 1990 to 1991.
It was also broadcast on TF1 in France under the name Bioman 2: Maskman and marketed as a sequel to Choudenshi Bioman. This was actually the third series to be shown in the region as they also aired Choushinsei Flashman around the same time as Maskman.
It was aired in Hong Kong on September 9, 1989 until September 22, 1990 with all 51 episodes dubbed in Cantonese Chinese on TVB Jade. 
It was aired in Thailand with a Thai dub from 1989-1990 on Channel 3, currently owned by TIGA Company.
It was aired in Brazil with a Brazilian Portuguese dub debuting on April 22, 1991 under Defensores da Luz Maskman. (Maskman - Defenders of Light) on Rede Manchete and came out around the same time as two other Toei Tokusatsu shows on the same channel which was Jikuu Senshi Spielban and Kamen Rider Black. It was the fourth and final Super Sentai to air on the channel (the other three that aired before were Dengeki Sentai Changeman, Choushinsei Flashman and Dai Sentai Goggle Five) before they decided to dub for Power Rangers adaptations starting with Mighty Morphin Power Rangers in 1994, due to the decline of interest of Japanese tokusatsu in the region and also due to financial and bureaucratic issues. Although there were more plans to bring more Super Sentai into Brazil as Choujyu Sentai Liveman and Kousoku Sentai Turboranger were already licensed and were set to be shown in Brazil, but went unaired followed by the decision to air Power Rangers, as it was getting very popular and Saban was weighing competition in most international markets.
It was shown in South Korea from 1990 to 1991 with a Korean dub under  Warriors of the Light: Maskman (빛의 전사 마스크맨). As of the Korean dub of Kaizoku Sentai Gokaiger, it was officially renamed Power Rangers Maskman. (파워레인저 마스크맨)
In Indonesia, the series was first aired on RCTI in 1990 and later re-aired on SCTV from June 7, 1996 until May 23, 1997 with an Indonesian dub covering all episodes. Then it re-aired again from May 30, 1997 until March 6, 1998. But the re-run went unfinished with not all episodes shown again due to the impact of the 1997-1999 Asian financial crisis.

Appearances in Power Rangers
The Maskman team appeared in Power Rangers Megaforce as the Lightning Rangers.

Notes

References

External links
 Official Hikari Sentai Maskman website 

1987 Japanese television series debuts
1988 Japanese television series endings
Martial arts television series
Buddhism in fiction
Super Sentai
TV Asahi original programming
Works about cars
1980s Japanese television series